Minette may refer to:

People
 Minette et Lise (1767–1807; 1771–?), Haitian actress sisters
 "Minette" (Henrietta of England) (1644–1670), daughter of King Charles I and Duchess of Orléans
 "Minette" (Anne-Catherine de Ligniville, Madame Helvétius) (1722–1800), French salon hostess 
 Minette Walters (born 1949), a British crime writer

Other uses
 a geological term used to locally describe a particular type of lamprophyre
 Minette (ore)
 Patron-Minette, a fictional criminal gang in the novel Les Miserables

See also
 Minet (disambiguation)
 Minnette
 Mynett